is the conventional term for the Spanish tradition of  fencing of the early modern period. The word  literally translates to 'dexterity' or 'skill, ability', and thus  to 'the true skill' or 'the true art'.

While  is primarily a system of swordsmanship, it is intended to be a universal method of fighting, applicable to all weapons in principle, but in practice dedicated to the rapier specifically, or the rapier combined with a defensive weapon such as a cloak, a buckler or a parrying dagger, besides other weapons such as the late-renaissance two-handed montante; the flail; and polearms such as the pike and halberd.

Its precepts are based on reason, geometry, and tied to intellectual, philosophical, and moral ideals, incorporating various  aspects of a well-rounded Renaissance humanist education, with a special focus on the writings of classical authors such as Aristotle, Euclid, and Plato.

The tradition is documented in scores of fencing manuals, but centers on the works of two primary authors, Jerónimo Sánchez de Carranza (Hieronimo de Carança, died c. 1608) and his student Luis Pacheco de Narváez (1570–1640).

History
Jerónimo Carranza's seminal treatise  was published in 1582 under the sponsorship of Don Alonso de Guzmán El Bueno, 7th Duke of Medina Sidonia , but according to its colophon was compiled as early as 1569. Pacheco in a letter to the Duke of Cea in Madrid on 4 May 1618 stated that Carranza's system was based on the work of Italian fencing theorist Camillo Agrippa.

Writers on  took great care to distinguish their "true art" from the "vulgar" or "common" fencing. The older school continued to exist alongside , but was increasingly influenced by its forms and concepts.

After Carranza laid the groundwork for the school with his seminal work, Pacheco de Narváez continued with a series of other books which expanded upon Carranza's concepts. While Pacheco originally clung closely to Carranza's precepts, he gradually diverged from them in significant respects. This divergence eventually caused a split between followers of Carranza and those of Pacheco, essentially resulting in the existence of three different schools of fence in Iberia.

These new fencing methods quickly spread to the New World. Carranza himself was governor of Honduras for a time.  authors and masters can be documented in Mexico, Peru, Ecuador, and the Philippines. Some degree of influence on the Philippine martial arts is highly likely, although this is an area that requires further research.

El Buscón (1626) by Francisco de Quevedo ridicules a student of Pacheco's Libro de las grandezas de la espada. The chapter ends with a mulatto fencing master who comments that "the book [...] was good but made more fools than skilled [fencers], since most did not understand it". Quevedo also composed injurious poems against Pacheco.

In the 18th century,  began a decline in popularity in favour of the dominant French school. This resulted in technical changes which become increasingly apparent by the beginning of the 18th century. By the 19th century, fencing texts in the Iberian Peninsula begin to mix  concepts with ideas and technique drawn from French and Italian methodology. While  underwent a kind of revival in the late 19th century, it appears to have largely disappeared by the beginning of the 20th century.

Technical characteristics
Technical hallmarks of the system are the following:

 Visualization of an imaginary circle between the opponents to conceptualize distance and movement
 Use of off-line footwork to obtain a favorable angle of attack
 Avoidance of movement directly toward the opponent
 Extension of the sword arm in a straight line from the shoulder to obtain maximum reach
 Profiling of the body to increase reach and reduce target area
 Use of an initial distance that is as close as possible, while remaining out of reach
 Preference for downwards motion in all fencing actions
 Use of both cut and thrust
 Use of a particular type of closing movement to disarm the opponent

Over centuries, fencing throughout Europe generally moved towards linear footwork, similar to modern fencing. In contrast,  doctrine taught that moving directly toward the opponent was dangerous, and specialized in off-line footwork to either the right or left side to gain a more favorable angle of attack.

Another distinction is their approach to the relative value of cut versus thrust. The general lengthening of rapiers in Europe showed a clear preference for the thrust, relegating the cut to a distant second place. , on the other hand, refused to make such a distinction, maintaining that the cut could be as useful as the thrust depending on the situation, adapting their weapons accordingly.

Gradually, bladework in Europe was influenced by the works of Camillo Agrippa and successors, focusing on the use of four primary hand and blade positions, with an emphasis on the latter two.

Throughout Europe, masters generally taught a much wider variety of guards than  masters, who focused on the so-called "right angle", a position with the arm extended directly from the shoulder, forming a straight line from the point of the sword to the left shoulder.

Generally,  uses a finer graduation on the degrees of strength on the blade. Where other traditions generally recognized two degrees of strength (forte and debole), eventually expanding this to three or four parts,  authors wrote about 9, 10, or even 12 "degrees" or segments on the sword.

 masters paid close attention to the methods of their contemporary counterparts, both within the Iberian Peninsula and outside. Pacheco specifically argues against the works of many Italian authors in his text  (The New Science). Likewise, Thibault's work includes a section aimed at countering the techniques of Salvator Fabris. Francisco Lórenz de Rada's work also contains substantial coverage of how a  should oppose an Italian opponent when using sword and dagger.

Primary sources

Early modern
 Jerónimo Sánchez de Carranza,  (1582)
 Luis Pacheco de Narváez, Libro de las grandezas de la espada (1600)
 Diogo Gomes de Figueiredo, Oplosophia (1628)
 Gerard Thibault,  (1630); trans. John Michael Greer Academy of the Sword, The Chivalry Bookshelf (2006)
 Luis Méndez de Carmona Tamariz (ca. 1639)
 Diogo Gomes de Figueiredo,  (1651).
 Miguel Pérez de Mendoza y Quijada (1672, 1675)
 Francisco Antonio de Ettenhard (Tenarde) y Abarca
 Alvaro Guerra de la Vega (1681)
 Thomaz Luiz,  (1685)
 Francisco Lórenz de Rada (1695)
 Nicolás Tamariz,  (1696)
 Manuel Cruzado y Peralta (1702)
 Francisco Lórenz de Rada (1705)

19th century
 Manuel Antonio de Brea,  (1805)
 Simon de Frias,  (1809)
 Jaime Merelo y Casademunt,  (1862)

Popular culture
 El Buscón (1626) by Francisco de Quevedo ridicules a student of Pacheco's Las grandezas de la espada. The chapter ends with a mulatto fencing master who comments that "the book [...] was good but made more fools than skilled [fencers], since most did not understand it". Quevedo also composed injurious poems against Pacheco.
 The film The Mask of Zorro (1998) featured Don Diego, the original Zorro, teaching Alejandro Murrieta, the new Zorro in the  style.
 The television series Queen of Swords features the use of the rapier in the mysterious circle  style favoured by the first swordmaster of the series Anthony De Longis who studied the Spanish sword fighting technique and wanted a unique style for the heroine. He had previously used it in the episode "Duende" of the Highlander TV series where he co-choreographed his fight scenes with series swordmaster, F. Braun McAsh.
 The film Alatriste, based on the novels by Arturo Pérez-Reverte, features various characters fencing in the  style, including the protagonist Diego Alatriste portrayed by Viggo Mortensen.
 The 2007 Russian historical fantasy film 1612 also shows this style of fencing as an important element of the movie's plot.

See also

Swordsmanship

References

 José María Hermoso Rivero, "Jerónimo Sánchez de Carranza (¿1539-1608?), creador de la Verdadera Destreza y gobernador de Honduras", Boletín del Centro de Estudios de la Costa Noroeste de Cádiz (CECONOCA) Cartare nº 5. (2015), 65-98.
Sébastien Romagnan, Destreza, manuel d'escrime  (2013), English translation Destreza, historical fencing (2015)
Anthony De Longis

External links
Asociación Española de Esgrima Antigua (A.E.E.A.)
The Destreza Translation and Research Project (DTRP)
The Martinez Academy of Arms
Academia da Espada
London Longsword Academy

Swordsmanship
Historical European martial arts
Historical fencing